The Belfast Knights is an American Football team and Ireland's longest running American Football club, formerly Carrickfergus Knights. Founded in 1993 by Eddie Kelly, the Knights have been National Champions 3 times, in 1997, 1998 and 2002 and have competed in 9 of the 15 championship games.
Their current coaching structure consists of Adam Devenney as head coach, Spencer Mcdowel as offensive co-ordinator, Simon Devenney as defensive co-ordinator and Adam Devenney as special teams co-ordinator.

History

1994
In the Knights' inaugural season, they reached the All-Ireland Championship, but were narrowly beaten by the Dublin Tornadoes, 21–15.

1995
The team reached the All-Ireland Championship again and were beaten, once again, by the Dublin Tornadoes, this time more convincingly, by a final score of 44–12.

1996
The '96 team were destined to struggle from the start of the season with so many people leaving the team at the one time. However, despite this large setback, they reached the semi-finals and were defeated by the eventual champions, the Dublin Lightning 3 – 0 in double overtime.

1997
1997 saw founder, Eddie Kelly retire from running the team. His position was taken by Errol Maxwell. In the preseason games for 1997, it was clear that the team, with its new assignment of players were going to make a promising impact on the league that year. The Knights only lost one regular season game that year and they went on to win Shamrock Bowl XII by beating the Dublin Bulls 21–0.

1998
1998 saw the team unbeaten (two ties with the Dublin Tigers though!) and win the Shamrock Bowl for the second consecutive time by defeating the Tigers 22–14 at Carrickfergus Rugby Club on Sunday 30 August. The team made history in May by playing an American NCAA rated team (Maranatha Bible Baptist College) for the first time.

1999
The '99 team were defeated by the Dublin Tigers 22–6 in Shamrock Bowl XIV.

2001
With veteran linebacker Mark Harris installed as coach, the '01 Knights won the reformed league (now re-structured as the IAFL) with a record of 5–1. They contested Shamrock Bowl XV against the Dublin Rebels led by Brian Dennehy, but were beaten by the greater experience of the Rebel side. The Dublin Rebels won by a margin of 28–7.

2002
The Knights won the Shamrock Bowl for the third time in their history in 2002. After finishing runner's up in the league to the UL Vikings, they faced them again in Shamrock Bowl XVI, played at UL Sports Centre in Limerick. The Knights beat the severely weakened Vikings team by a record margin of 66–0.

2003
The '03 team qualified for Shamrock Bowl XVII as League Champions, where they matched up against the Dublin Rebels. The match was played at Old Suttonians Rugby Club in Dublin and the home team took the Championship with a 24–12 scoreline. 2003 also saw the Knights travel to Belgium for the Charleroi Cup, having qualified as the previous year's Shamrock Bowl winners. There, they finished in 3rd place, with the Dublin Rebels winning their second successive tournament.

Season By Season IAFL records

|-
| colspan="6" align="center" | IAFL
|-
|1994 || ? || ? || ? || ?? || Runner-up – Shamrock Bowl IX
|-
|1995 || ? || ? || ? || ?? || Runner-up – Shamrock Bowl X
|-
|1996 || ? || ? || ? || ?? || ??
|-
|1997 || ? || ? || ? || IAFL League Champions|| Champions – Shamrock Bowl XII
|-
|1998 || 6 || 0 || 2 || IAFL League Champions|| Champions – Shamrock Bowl XIII
|-
|1999 || ? || ? || ? || ?? || Runner-up – Shamrock Bowl XIV
|-
|2000 || 0 || 0 || 0 || No League Play || N/A
|-
|2001 || 5 || 1 || 0 || IAFL League Champions|| Runner-up – Shamrock Bowl XV
|-
|2002 || 4 || 2 || 0 || 2nd IAFL|| Champions – Shamrock Bowl XVI
|-
|2003 || 5 || 1 || 0 || IAFL League Champions|| Runner-up – Shamrock Bowl XVII
|-
|2004 || 6 || 1 || 1 || 2nd IAFL|| Runner-up – Shamrock Bowl XVIII
|-
|2005 || 5 || 2 || 1 || 3rd IAFL|| Beaten Semi-finalists
|-
|2006 || 6 || 2 || 0 || 2nd IAFL || Beaten Semi-finalists
|-
|2007 || 3 || 4 || 1 || 3rd IAFL North|| –
|-
|2008 || 3 || 5 || 0 || 2nd IAFL North|| –
|-
|2009 || 6 || 2 || 0 || 3rd IAFL|| Beaten Semi-finalists
|-
|2010 || 6 || 2 || 0 || 3rd IAFL|| Beaten Semi-finalists
|-
|2011 || 6 || 2 || 0 || 2nd IAFL|| Beaten Semi-finalists
|-
|2012 || 2 || 6 || 0 || 3rd IAFL North|| Beaten Semi-finalists
|-
|2013 || 3 || 4 || 1 || IAFL North SBC || Beaten Quarter-Finalists
|-
|2014 || 3 || 5 || 0 || IAFL North SBC || Beaten Quarter-Finalists
|-
|2015 || 2 || 6 || 0 || IAFL North SBC || –
|-
|2016 || 5 || 3 || 0 || IAFL North SBC || Beaten Quarter-Finalists
|-
|2017 || 5 || 3 || 0 || IAFL North SBC Champions || Runner-up – Shamrock Bowl XXXI 
|-
|Totals || 81 || 51 || 6
|colspan="2"|

Knights Individual Awards

Knights MVP

Knights Offensive Player of the Year

Knights Defensive Player of the Year

Special Teams Player of the Year

Knights Rookie of the Year

Knights Most Improved Player

External links
 Official website
 IAFL official website

American football teams in Northern Ireland
Sports clubs in County Antrim
1993 establishments in Northern Ireland
American football teams established in 1993